The name water vine may refer to at least two plants, both in the Vitaceae (grape) family:

 Cissus hypoglauca, a common Australian vine
 Vitis tiliifolia, a vine of the Americas